The Province of Biella (Piedmontese: Provincia ëd Biela) is a province of Italy located in Piedmont. It was created in 1992 and its capital is the city of Biella.

There are 82 comuni (singular: comune) in the province .

The main comuni by population are:

Culture

Sacro Monte di Oropa

Biella is home to the Sacred Mountain of Oropa, which became a UNESCO World Heritage Site in 2003.

External links
 Official website
 Official web site for European Sacred Mounts

 
Biella